Olivia is the second studio album by the British-Australian singer-songwriter Olivia Newton-John, released in 1972. Two of its songs were released as singles ("What Is Life" and "Just a Little Too Much"). In its initial release, it was not issued in the United States, though it was sold there as an import. A digitally remastered version was released in 1995.

Reception
The first single "What Is Life" reached number 18 in Ireland, and number 16 in the UK, but the album itself was a commercial failure when released in the UK on Pye International in 1972. 

The cover art, done in blue tint, was later used (in a blueish-green tint) as the cover of the US release of Let Me Be There on MCA Records in 1973, following the success of the hit single penned by John Rostill.

Track listing
 "Angel of the Morning" (Chip Taylor) – 3:54
 "Just a Little Too Much" (Johnny Burnette) – 2:07
 "If We Only Have Love" (Eric Blau, Jacques Brel, Mort Shuman) – 3:22
 "Winterwood" (Don McLean) – 2:48
 "My Old Man's Got a Gun" (John Farrar) – 2:48
 "Changes" (Olivia Newton-John) – 2:30
 "I'm a Small and Lonely Light" (John Farrar, Peter Best) – 2:43
 "Why Don't You Write Me" (Paul Simon) – 2:38
 "Mary Skeffington" (Gerry Rafferty) – 2:29
 "Behind That Locked Door" (George Harrison) – 3:06
 "What Is Life" (George Harrison) – 3:21
 "Everything I Own" (David Gates) – 3:00
 "Living in Harmony" (Alan Tarney, Trevor Spencer) – 2:47
 "I Will Touch You" (Steve Cagan) – 3:05

References

1972 albums
Olivia Newton-John albums
Albums with cover art by Hipgnosis
Albums produced by Bruce Welch
Albums produced by John Farrar